Ruwellyn Miguel Isbell (born 17 February 1993) is a South African professional rugby union player for the  in the Currie Cup and in the Rugby Challenge. His regular position is winger.

Career

Youth

In 2006, he appeared for Eastern Province at the Under-13 Craven Week competition. He then joined Grey College in Bloemfontein and played for the Free State Under-16 side at the 2009 Grant Khomo Week and their Under-18 side at the 2011 Craven Week, alongside future Springbok Jan Serfontein.

In 2010, he was included in an Under-18 High Performance squad that played in international friendlies against youth sides from France, Namibia and England. The following year, he was included in the S.A. Schools side that faced a France Invitational side, but missed the game through injury.

He moved to Pretoria in 2012 to join the  academy. He made ten appearances and scored three tries during the 2012 Under-19 Provincial Championship competition as the  side reached the final of the competition.

Sevens

At the end of 2012, Isbell received a call-up to the South Africa Sevens side for the 2012–13 IRB Sevens World Series and he made his debut at the 2012 Gold Coast Sevens. He also played in the Dubai and South African legs of the competition and won a gold medal at the 2013 World Games.

Pumas

He moved to Nelspruit-based side  in 2014.

He was a member of the Pumas side that won the Vodacom Cup for the first time in 2015, beating  24–7 in the final. Isbell made three appearances during the season, scoring three tries.

References

1993 births
Living people
People from Blue Crane Route Local Municipality
South African rugby union players
Pumas (Currie Cup) players
South Africa international rugby sevens players
World Games gold medalists
Competitors at the 2013 World Games
Rugby union players from the Eastern Cape